Datuk Razif Sidek  (born 29 May 1962) is a former badminton player from Malaysia and coach.

Personal life
He is the second eldest of the famous five Sidek brothers. Razif and his siblings gained exposure about badminton sport from their father, Haji Mohd Sidek. Under the guidance of his father, Razif and the rest of his siblings were destined to be Malaysia's champions. In addition, Razif Sidek is one of the alumni of Victoria Institution (batch 1974–1979).

He is married to a former model, Khalidah Khalid and the couple is blessed with five children. In addition, his youngest son, Mohd Fazriq is also active in badminton just like his father. He became a grandfather in December 2018, after one of his children became a first-time parent.

Career
His regular partner is his younger brother, Jalani. Razif won a gold medal for Malaysia at the 1982 Commonwealth Games doubles with Ong Beng Teong. They made the nation sit up and take notice when they won the All England Championships in 1982 after beating the Scottish pair, Billy Gilliland and Dan Travers.

The Sidek brothers won almost every title on offer during their playing career, including the World Grand Prix, World Cup, SEA Games, Commonwealth Games and Asian Championships. They introduced the infamous “S” Service, which caused a deceptively erratic shuttle movement, which confounded their opponents and officials alike. The service caused much uproar and was eventually banned by the International Badminton Federation (IBF).

He was also a member of the Malaysian squad that won the Thomas Cup for the first time in 25 years, in a 3–2 victory over Indonesia at the National Stadium in 1992. He created history by becoming the first Malaysian athlete to win an Olympic Games medal in Barcelona 1992. They won a bronze medal for Malaysia after reaching the semi-finals in the men's doubles category where they lost to the Korean pair, Park Joo-bong and Kim Moon-Soo.

During his career with Jalani, they become one of the best four doubles pair in the world (Park Joo-bong/Kim Moon-soo, Rudy Gunawan/Eddy Hartono and Tian Bingyi/Li Yongbo) from the 1980s until the early 1990s.

Coaching
After he retired, he served as Malaysian national head coach from 1994 until 1996. Razif guided Cheah Soon Kit-Yap Kim Hock to Malaysia's first-ever Olympic silver medal at the 1996 Atlanta Games.

Achievements

Olympic Games 
Men's doubles

World Championships 
Men's doubles

World Cup 
Men's doubles

Asian Games 
Men's doubles

Asian Championships 
Men's doubles

Southeast Asian Games 
Men's doubles

Commonwealth Games 
Men's singles

Men's doubles

IBF World Grand Prix 
The World Badminton Grand Prix sanctioned by International Badminton Federation (IBF) since from 1983 to 2006.

Men's doubles

IBF International 
Men's doubles

Honours
  :
 Member of the Order of the Defender of the Realm (A.M.N.) (1983)
  Herald of the Order of Loyalty to the Royal Family of Malaysia (B.S.D.) (1988)
  Officer of the Order of the Defender of the Realm (K.M.N.) (1992)

See also
 Misbun Sidek
 Jalani Sidek
 Rahman Sidek
 Rashid Sidek

References

External links
 

1962 births
Living people
People from Selangor
Malaysian Muslims
Malaysian people of Malay descent
Malaysian male badminton players
Badminton coaches
Olympic badminton players of Malaysia
Olympic medalists in badminton
Olympic bronze medalists for Malaysia
Medalists at the 1992 Summer Olympics
Badminton players at the 1992 Summer Olympics
Commonwealth Games gold medallists for Malaysia
Commonwealth Games bronze medallists for Malaysia
Badminton players at the 1990 Commonwealth Games
Badminton players at the 1982 Commonwealth Games
Asian Games medalists in badminton
Badminton players at the 1982 Asian Games
Badminton players at the 1986 Asian Games
Badminton players at the 1990 Asian Games
Asian Games silver medalists for Malaysia
Asian Games bronze medalists for Malaysia
Commonwealth Games medallists in badminton
Medalists at the 1990 Asian Games
Southeast Asian Games gold medalists for Malaysia
Southeast Asian Games silver medalists for Malaysia
Southeast Asian Games bronze medalists for Malaysia
Southeast Asian Games medalists in badminton
Members of the Order of the Defender of the Realm
Officers of the Order of the Defender of the Realm
Competitors at the 1985 Southeast Asian Games
Competitors at the 1989 Southeast Asian Games
Competitors at the 1991 Southeast Asian Games
World No. 1 badminton players
Heralds of the Order of Loyalty to the Royal Family of Malaysia
Medallists at the 1982 Commonwealth Games
Medallists at the 1990 Commonwealth Games